"Happiness" is a song recorded by English band the 1975. It was released on 3 August 2022 as the second single from their fifth studio album, Being Funny in a Foreign Language (2022).

The song peaked at number 46 on the UK Singles Chart and 65 in Ireland.

Composition 
"Happiness" is a disco song. It was written by band members Matty Healy and George Daniel with DJ Sabrina the Teenage DJ. Healy, Daniel, and Jack Antonoff serve as its producers. The song is performed in the key of B major with a tempo of 118 beats per minute in common time. The band's vocals span from F4 to G5 and follows a chord progression of B–Gm–F–B–Gm–Dm.

Charts

References 

2022 singles
2022 songs
The 1975 songs
Dirty Hit singles
Disco songs